The following buildings were added to the National Register of Historic Places as part of the Country Club Estates Thematic Resource (or TR).

Gallery

References

Country Club
National Register of Historic Places Multiple Property Submissions in Florida